Yo Soy Kids is a singing and imitation contest for children produced by Endemol in Peru. It premiered on March 9, 2014 by Latina. It is hosted by Cristian Rivero and Alexandra Hörler, the jury is composed of former children's entertainer María Pía Copello, singer Maricarmen Marín and presenter Rodrigo González. The coaches are the singers Katy Jara, Leslie Shaw and Cristopher Gianotti.

On November 6, 2017, after 3 years, a new season of Yo Soy Kids was released, which is more similar to the regular seasons of Yo Soy (Perú). It is conducted by Adolfo Aguilar and Cristian Rivero, while the jury is composed of Katia Palma, Maricarmen Marín and Fernando Armas.

Format 
The program has three judges in charge of selecting the contestants who are most similar to the artist they selected, both for their voice and for the physical resemblance. The jury is in charge of selecting the participants that will be classified to appear in the "galas", in which they will compete to reach the final.

Seasons

References

External links
 

Peruvian television shows
2010s Peruvian television series
2014 Peruvian television series debuts
Latina Televisión original programming